Per Hansson (born 31 December 1962) is a Swedish sports shooter. He competed in three events at the 1988 Summer Olympics.

References

External links
 

1962 births
Living people
Swedish male sport shooters
Olympic shooters of Sweden
Shooters at the 1988 Summer Olympics
Sport shooters from Stockholm